Harry Hemming Cornish (19 February 1871 – 24 October 1918) was an English cricketer.  Cornish's batting and bowling styles are unknown.  The son of James Cornish and Fanny Hemming, he was born in St James's Park, London.

Cornish made a single first-class appearance for Middlesex in 1893 against the touring Australians.  In the Australians first-innings, he bowled 3 wicket-less overs.  In Middlesex first-innings, he scored a single run before being dismissed by Hugh Trumble.  In the Australians second-innings, he bowled 2 further wicket-less overs, while in the Middlesex second-innings, he scored 6 runs before being dismissed by George Giffen.

Two years later he married Florence Gwatkin, before later emigrating to the United States.  His marriage to Florence must have ended in divorce, because 5 years later he married a woman called Dorethy in the United States.  They had one son, Richard V. C. Cornish.  While in America, he played cricket for Belmont Cricket Club, and in 1909 he played for the United States cricket team against Canada.  He died in Bala, Pennsylvania on 24 October 1918.

References

External links
Harry Cornish at ESPNcricinfo
Harry Cornish at CricketArchive

1871 births
1918 deaths
People from Westminster
Cricketers from Greater London
English cricketers
Middlesex cricketers
English expatriates in the United States
American cricketers